Independence is a 1999 Malayalam-language fantasy film directed by Vinayan, starring Vani Viswanath, Khushbu, Kalabhavan Mani and Indraja.

Cast
 Vani Viswanath as Indu Varma
 Indraja as Sindhu Varma
 Khushbu as Commissioner R.Sreedevi IPS
 Kalabhavan Mani as Munna
 Vijayaraghavan as P.Raveedran IAS / Sinkaramuthu
 Captain Raju as Badabhai/Ilayad Bhai
 Cochin Haneefa as Balachandra Kammath
 Rajan P. Dev as Mukundan
 Jagathy Sreekumar as C.I. Manmadhan Potty, Sub Inspector
 Sadiq as Govindan
 Krishna as Kithu
 Zainuddin as Head Constable
 Spadikam George as Inspector General
 Innocent as Mythrayan 
 Murali as Kunikal Vasu
 Sai Kumar as Chief Minister Raghavan
 Siddique as  Prabhakara Varma Thampuran (Cameo appearance)
 Bindu Nair as Parvathi Bhai Thampuratti
 Shivaji Malayalam actor as Rtd. DIG Mahadeva Kaimal
 Sukumari as Pappamma
 Manka Mahesh as Sarojanda Swamiji Amma
 K. T. S. Padannayil as Madhavan Master
 Machan Varghese
 Joju George

Soundtrack

Box office
The film was box office hit earned around  6.50 Crores.

References

External links
 
 https://archive.today/20130217233337/http://popcorn.oneindia.in/title/5354/independence.html

1999 films
1990s Malayalam-language films
Films directed by Vinayan